Vijay Vishwa (formerly known as Abi Saravanan) is an Indian actor, who has appeared in Tamil language films. He has acted in films including Touring Talkies (2015) and Saahasam (2016).

Career 
After completing a degree in engineering, Abi Saravanan wanted to become an actor and began looking for opportunities to enter the film industry. Abi initially played small supporting roles in Attakathi (2012) and Kutti Puli (2013). He successfully auditioned for the lead role in S. S. Kumaran's film, Kerala Nattilam Pengaludane (2014) and portrayed a young man looking for a bride in his film. His second film was Touring Talkies (2015), where he portrayed the younger version of S. A. Chandrasekhar's character. He later appeared in a supporting role in Prashanth's Saahasam (2016).

In 2015, he worked on several small budget films titled Plus or Minus directed by newcomer Jai, the horror film Irayan by Saravanan Periasamy, Andha Oru Naal and Nadakkam.

In November 2016, Abi went to Nagapattinam District to help the people  who had affected by Gaja Cyclone. In 2019 Abi Saravanan also helped flood affected people in Assam. In 2021, he changed his name to Vijay Vishwa.

Filmography

References

External links 
 

Living people
Male actors from Madurai
Male actors in Tamil cinema
21st-century Indian male actors
Tamil male actors
Year of birth missing (living people)